Weight transfer is the redistribution of weight supported by each tire during acceleration of an automobile.

Weight transfer may also refer to one of the following:

Weight transfer (dancing)
Weight transfer (combat sports)